Kimy Pernía Domicó (1950–2001) was an indigenous leader of the Embera Katio in Colombia. He is best known for testifying before a Canadian parliamentary Sub-Committee on Human Rights and International Development in Ottawa in 1999 in which he criticized the Urra Dam project and its effects on the Embera Katio peoples. His criticism lead to his abduction and disappearance on June 2, 2001. His whereabouts remain unknown.

Kimy was given tribute in the book titled "Blue gold: the battle against corporate theft of the world's water" by Barlow and Clarke, first published in 2002.

References

 http://canadians.org/blog/remembering-water-justice-activist-kimy-pernia-domico
 Barlow, M. and Clarke, T. (2017) Blue gold: the battle against corporate theft of the world's water. London: Routledge.

1950 births
2001 deaths
People from Córdoba Department
Indigenous leaders of the Americas
People murdered in Colombia